Donald J. Aitken (born c. 1945) is a Canadian curler from Montreal. He was the second of the 1977 Brier Champion team, representing Quebec. He is a member of the Canadian Curling Hall of Fame.

Aitken worked in textiles.

References

External links

 Don Aitken – Curling Canada Stats Archive

1940s births
Living people
Canadian male curlers
Brier champions
Curlers from Quebec
Sportspeople from Tillsonburg
Sportspeople from Montreal
20th-century Canadian people